Brill is an unincorporated community located in Barron County, Wisconsin, United States. Brill is east of Haugen, in the town of Oak Grove.

History
Brill was platted in 1902. The community was named for Hascal R. Brill, a Minnesota judge. A post office called Brill was established in 1902, and remained in operation until it was discontinued in 1993.

References

Unincorporated communities in Barron County, Wisconsin
Unincorporated communities in Wisconsin